Polyipnus is a genus of oceanic ray-finned fish in the family Sternoptychidae. This is the largest genus of the marine hatchetfishes subfamily Sternoptychinae and indeed of the entire Sternoptychidae. It is not quite as apomorphic as their relatives; it may be that the genus is actually a paraphyletic assemblage of less advanced Sternoptychinae and would need to be split.

Fossils of this genus show that they have existed at least since the Early Oligocene, about 30 million years ago.

Species
There are currently 33 recognized species in this genus:
 Polyipnus aquavitus R. C. Baird, 1971 (aquavit hatchetfish)
 Polyipnus asper Harold, 1994
 Polyipnus asteroides L. P. Schultz, 1938
 Polyipnus bruuni Harold, 1994
 Polyipnus clarus Harold, 1994 (slope hatchetfish)
 Polyipnus danae Harold, 1990
 Polyipnus elongatus Borodulina, 1979
 Polyipnus fraseri Fowler, 1934
 Polyipnus indicus L. P. Schultz, 1961
 Polyipnus inermis Borodulina, 1981
 Polyipnus kiwiensis R. C. Baird, 1971 (kiwi hatchetfish)
 Polyipnus laternatus Garman, 1899
 Polyipnus latirastrus Last & Harold, 1994 (comb-side hatchetfish)
 Polyipnus limatulus Harold & Wessel, 1998
 Polyipnus matsubarai L. P. Schultz, 1961
 Polyipnus meteori Kotthaus, 1967
 Polyipnus notatus Harold, I. M. Kemp & Shore, 2016 
 Polyipnus nuttingi C. H. Gilbert, 1905 (Nutting's hatchetfish)
 Polyipnus oluolus R. C. Baird, 1971
 Polyipnus omphus R. C. Baird, 1971
 Polyipnus ovatus Harold, 1994
 Polyipnus parini Borodulina, 1979
 Polyipnus paxtoni Harold, 1989 (Paxton's hatchetfish)
 Polyipnus polli L. P. Schultz, 1961 (round hatchetfish)
 Polyipnus ruggeri R. C. Baird, 1971 (rugby hatchetfish)
 Polyipnus soelae Harold, 1994 (Soela hatchetfish)
 Polyipnus spinifer Borodulina, 1979
 Polyipnus spinosus Günther, 1887 (spiny hatchetfish)
 Polyipnus stereope D. S. Jordan & Starks, 1904
 Polyipnus surugaensis Aizawa, 1990
 Polyipnus tridentifer McCulloch, 1914 (three-spined hatchetfish)
 Polyipnus triphanos L. P. Schultz, 1938 (three-light hatchetfish)
 Polyipnus unispinus L. P. Schultz, 1938

References

 

Sternoptychidae
Extant Rupelian first appearances
Taxa named by Albert Günther
Ray-finned fish genera
Rupelian genus first appearances